Gino Michael Minutelli (born May 23, 1964) is a retired Major League Baseball pitcher. He played during three seasons at the major league level for the Cincinnati Reds and San Francisco Giants. He was signed by the Reds as an amateur free agent in 1982. Minutelli played his first professional season with their Class-A (Short Season) Tri-City Triplets in 1985, and his last with the Atlanta Braves' Triple-A Richmond Braves in 1995. Played for Sweetwater High School in National City.

Early life 
Gino was born May 23, 1964, in Wilmington, Delaware. Not much is known about his childhood, expect for his high school being Sweetwater High School (National City,), and his college of choice being Southwestern College. Gino appears to have been born in Delaware, but spent his life in California. He played at the Major League for the Cincinnati Reds for the first time in 1990, during the 1990 National League session. His last game was on September 9, 1993, for the San Francisco Giants. Due to exceeding rookie limits, he was retired from the team. When he was enacted into the Cincinnati Reds, he was living with his parents and working in a unknown department store.

References

"Gino Minutelli Statistics". The Baseball Cube. 20 January 2008.
"Gino Minutelli Statistics". Baseball-Reference. 20 January 2008.

1964 births
Living people
Cincinnati Reds players
San Francisco Giants players
Major League Baseball pitchers
Baseball players from Wilmington, Delaware
Tampa Tarpons (1957–1987) players
Tri-Cities Triplets players
Gulf Coast Reds players
Charleston Wheelers players
Phoenix Firebirds players
Richmond Braves players
Canton-Akron Indians players
Vermont Reds players
Nashville Sounds players
American expatriate baseball players in Mexico
Cedar Rapids Reds players
Chattanooga Lookouts players
Tucson Toros players